Queen's College, Queens' College or Queens College may refer to;

Colleges within universities
Queens' College, Cambridge, University of Cambridge, England
Queen's College, Melbourne, Australia
Queens College, City University of New York, US
Queen's College, Newfoundland, affiliated to the Memorial University of Newfoundland, Canada
The Queen's College, Oxford, University of Oxford, England

Other colleges
Queen's College, Birmingham, a predecessor college of the University of Birmingham, England
Queen's College, Edgbaston, now the Queen’s Foundation, a theological college in Birmingham, England
Queen's College, Edinburgh (active 1841–1842), part of the Edinburgh Extramural School of Medicine, Scotland
The Queen's College, Glasgow, which merged with Glasgow Polytechnic in 1993 to form Glasgow Caledonian University, Scotland

Schools
Queen's College, St James
Queen's College, Colombo, Sri Lanka, now Royal College, Colombo
Queen's College, Georgetown
Queen's College, Hong Kong, the first government school in Hong Kong
Queen's College, Lagos, Nigeria
Queen's College, London, England
Queen's College, Mallorca, a National Association of British Schools school in Spain
Queen's College, Nassau, Bahamas
Queen's College, North Adelaide, defunct boys' school in South Australia
Queen's College Boys' High School, Queenstown, Eastern Cape, South Africa
Queen's College, Taunton, England

Universities
Queen's College (1845–1908), now University of Galway, Ireland
Queen's College (1841–1877), now Queen's University at Kingston, Ontario, Canada
Queen's College (1845–1908), now Queen's University Belfast, Northern Ireland
Queen's College (1845–1908), now University College Cork, Ireland
Queen's College (1954–1967), now University of Dundee, Scotland
Queen's College (1766–1825), now Rutgers University, New Jersey, US
Queens College (1912–2002), now Queens University of Charlotte, North Carolina, US

See also
 
 
 
 
 
 
 Queen's University (disambiguation)
 Queen's campus (disambiguation)
 Queen Elizabeth College